Armored Warriors, known in Japan as , is a 1994 mecha-themed beat-em-up game released by Capcom as a coin-operated video game for their CP System II hardware. The "Variant Armors" mecha featured in the game were later used for the head-to-head fighting game Cyberbots: Full Metal Madness. After being included with the Retro-Bit Super Retro-Cade dedicated console, the game would later be released digitally as part of the Capcom Beat 'Em Up Bundle on September 18, 2018, for the Nintendo Switch, PlayStation 4, Xbox One, and Windows. and Capcom Arcade Stadium on February 17, 2021, for the Nintendo Switch, an later that year on PlayStation 4, Xbox One and Steam.

Gameplay 

Armored Warriors most prominent feature is its multi-player option, and the ability to augment the players' mechs with a large array of different parts for varied attacks. Multiple regions of the mech could be switched, including the arms, legs and handheld weaponry. Such parts were gained (or lost) by inflicting damage upon enemies, which would cause various parts to disembark and be wielded by the player. Additionally, by using commands, the players could use an option called a "Team-up Change" which initiated a powerful attack used in tandem, and could also further vary the customization of weapons by using a main and sub-weapon.

Gameplay follows a mission-like structure, with seven in total. Each stage consists of the game giving the player prerequisites such as a time-limit to eliminate enemies, a set amount of ammunition for weapons, and destroying a varying number of enemies. Each stage ended with a boss character, and the game provided a competent replay value with the customization options.

Plot 
In the year 2281, the United Earth Government and the Principalities of Raia signed a ceasefire treaty, ending a war that lasted for half a century. One year after the signing of the treaty, the United Earth Government's 18th scouting party reported that the Raian capital, Melkide, has been captured by an army of unknown origin. The United Earth Government decided to dispatch an army to Raia to retake the capital and rescue its citizens. However, unbeknownst to the general public, the true purpose of this operation was to eliminate the unknown enemy and bring Raia under Earth's control.

Characters 
 1st Lieutenant Jeff Perkins pilots the AEX-10M BLODIA, a well-designed machine that is equally matched in all areas of combat. Its firepower is below average but makes up slightly greater attack distance.
 Captain Ray Turner pilots the SVA-6L REPTOS, a mecha designed for close ranged/melee combat. Its light and mobile specifications make it plausible for high-speed situations.
 Major Glenn Reed  uses the AEX-10H GULDIN, a power-type mech used for absorbing damage and plowing through opposition. Its high attack statistics give it a low speed designation, however.
 2nd Lt Sarah White uses the AEX-12J FORDY, an extremely fast mech used for rushing attacks and a featuring a high mobility. It lacks a sufficient amount of armor and must use its speed to avoid damage.

Reception
In Japan, Game Machine listed Armored Warriors on their December 1, 1994 issue as being the sixth most-successful table arcade unit of the month.

In 2023, Time Extension included the game on their top 25 "Best Beat 'Em Ups of All Time" list.

See also
 List of beat 'em ups

References

External links
 Armored Warriors at Arcade History
 

1994 video games
Arcade video games
Capcom beat 'em ups
Cooperative video games
CP System II games
Science fiction video games
Side-scrolling beat 'em ups
Video games developed in Japan
Video games featuring female protagonists
Video games about mecha
Video games set in the 23rd century